Mana is a New Zealand parliamentary electorate in the Wellington metropolitian area.

Population centres
The electorate includes the following population centres:
 Paraparaumu (south of the airport, and east of the railway)
 Raumati Beach
 Raumati South
 Paekākāriki
 Pukerua Bay
 Karehana Bay
 Plimmerton
 Mana
 Camborne
 Paremata
 Whitby
 Pāuatahanui
 Porirua
 Linden

In the 2007 boundary redistribution, parts of Paraparaumu located east of State Highway 1 were added to the electorate's area. The 2013/14 redistribution did not change the boundaries further.

History
The electorate was created for the introduction of mixed-member proportional (MMP) representation in 1996 from the Porirua electorate, and from the southern part of the Kapiti electorate, consisting of Paraparaumu south of the airport, Raumati South and Raumati Beach. The 1996 election was won by Labour's Graham Kelly, who was member for the former Porirua electorate. He retired ahead of the 2002 election, Luamanuvao Winnie Laban became the new MP.

After the resignation of Laban 10 August 2010, 
Faafoi on the resulting by-election with 10,980 votes (46.4%), becoming the first MP of Tokelauan descent. Hekia Parata from the National Party was placed second and received 9,574 (41.6%), giving Faafoi a margin of 1,080 votes (4.82%). This was a significant decrease of Laban's majority of 6,155 (17.7%) at the 2008 general election.

Members of Parliament
Unless otherwise stated, all MPs' terms began and ended at a general election.

Key

List MPs
Members of Parliament elected from party lists in elections where that person also unsuccessfully contested the Mana electorate. Unless otherwise stated, all MPs' terms began and ended at general elections.

1 Also contested

Election results

2020 election

2017 election

2014 election

2011 election

Electorate (as at 26 November 2011): 44,393

2010 by-election

2008 election

2005 election

—

2002 election

1999 election

1996 election

Table footnotes

References

New Zealand electorates
Porirua
1996 establishments in New Zealand